Onome Ebi (born 8 May 1983) is a Nigerian professional footballer who plays as a centre-back for Spanish Liga F club FC Levante Las Planas and the Nigeria women's national team. In 2019 she became the first African footballer to play in 5 FIFA World Cup Tournaments.

Club career
She played for Bayelsa Queens FC in the Nigerian Women's Championship before moving to Piteå IF and Djurgårdens IF in Sweden's Damallsvenskan. Ebi said "I enjoyed my stay in Turkey because of the good weather. Going to Sweden was a different ball game, as the cold weather made it difficult for me to play good football. The amateur nature of the Swedish league made me launch a return to Turkey for Ataşehir Belediyespor FC in the First League."

She then played for Turkish sides Düvenciler Lisesispor and Ataşehir Belediyespor at the First League. She made her Champions League debut in August 2012 while playing for Ataşehir Belediyespor.

Ebi returned to the Swedish Damallsvenskan in 2013 to play for Sunnanå SK before going to Belarus to play for FC Minsk in the Belarusian Premier League. While there, she was a member of the team that won the Belarusian Premier League, the Belarusian Women's Cup and the Belarusian Women's Super Cup twice.

In both club and international competitions, Ebi plays as the number five in the team due to the significance it holds for her. When she arrived at Minsk, the jersey number was already taken, so she asked for the number 55 instead.

She currently plays for Chinese second division side Henan Jianye, where she signed in 2018.

International career
Ebi is a member of the Nigerian national team. On 6 July 2019, she became the first African Footballer to play in five Fifa World Cup Tournaments, taking part in the 2003, 2007, 2011 and 2015, 2019 editions of the FIFA Women's World Cup and the 2008 Beijing Olympics.

Ebi was also a member of the Nigerian squad in the 2008, 2010, 2012, 2014, 2016 and 2018 editions of the African Women's Championship, winning the tournament four times 2010, 2014) 2016 and 2018 .

Honours

Club
 Ataşehir Belediyespor
 Turkish Women's First Football League (2): 2011–12, 2012–13

 FC Minsk
 Belarusian Premier League (1): 2014
 Belarusian Women's Cup (1): 2014
 Belarusian Women's Super Cup (2): 2014, 2015

International
 Nigeria
 African Women's Championship (4): 2010, 2014, 2016, 2018

Individual
 NFF-Aiteo Female Player Of The Year: 2018
 IFFHS CAF Woman Team of the Decade 2011–2020

References

External links
 
 
 
 

1983 births
Living people
Sportspeople from Lagos
Nigerian women's footballers
Women's association football central defenders
Osun Babes F.C. players
Bayelsa Queens F.C. players
Piteå IF (women) players
Djurgårdens IF Fotboll (women) players
Lüleburgaz 39 Spor players
Ataşehir Belediyespor players
Sunnanå SK players
FC Minsk (women) players
Damallsvenskan players
Nigeria women's international footballers
2003 FIFA Women's World Cup players
2007 FIFA Women's World Cup players
Footballers at the 2008 Summer Olympics
Olympic footballers of Nigeria
2011 FIFA Women's World Cup players
2015 FIFA Women's World Cup players
2019 FIFA Women's World Cup players
Nigerian expatriate women's footballers
Nigerian expatriate sportspeople in Sweden
Expatriate women's footballers in Sweden
Nigerian expatriate sportspeople in Turkey
Expatriate women's footballers in Turkey
Nigerian expatriate sportspeople in Belarus
Expatriate women's footballers in Belarus
Nigerian expatriate sportspeople in China
Expatriate women's footballers in China